Anisopus is a small genus of plants in the family Apocynaceae first described as a genus in 1895. It is native to tropical Africa.

Species
 Anisopus bicoronata (K. Schum.) N.E. Br.  
 Anisopus efulensis (N.E.Br.) Goyder  
 Anisopus mannii N.E.Br.  
 Anisopus rostrifera (N.E. Br.) Bullock

References

Asclepiadoideae
Apocynaceae genera
Taxa named by N. E. Brown